Kaşaltı is a village in the District of Feke, Adana Province, Turkey.

References

Villages in Feke District